Mistissini Water Aerodrome  is located on Lake Mistassini near Mistissini, Quebec, Canada. It is open from May until mid-October.

References

Registered aerodromes in Nord-du-Québec
Seaplane bases in Quebec